The term Zhe school may refer to:
 Zhe school (painting), a 15th-century Chinese school of landscape painters
 Zhe school (guqin), a school of musicians for the guqin